Qezel Qayah may refer to:
 Qezel Qayah, Ardabil
 Qezel Qayah, Charuymaq, East Azerbaijan Province
 Qezel Qayah, Sarab, East Azerbaijan Province
 Qezel Qayeh-ye Olya, West Azerbaijan Province
 Qezel Qayeh-ye Sofla, West Azerbaijan Province
 Qezel Qayeh-ye Vosta, West Azerbaijan Province